Book Four: Balance is the fourth and final season of the animated television series The Legend of Korra by Michael Dante DiMartino and Bryan Konietzko. It consists of thirteen episodes ("chapters"), all animated by Studio Mir. The episodes were made available on the Nickelodeon website and other online outlets each Friday beginning on October 3, 2014 and premiered on Nicktoons on November 28, 2014. Critical reception of Book Four, as of the series in general, was positive. 

Book Four is set three years after the previous season. It deals with Avatar Korra's journey of self-discovery following the trauma she suffered in Book Three, and with the security officer Kuvira's campaign to unite the Earth Kingdom under her authoritarian leadership.

The season is then followed by the graphic novel trilogy Turf Wars, that picks up immediately after the series finale.

Production
After Nickelodeon cut the budget for season 4 by about the amount required for one episode, DiMartino and Konietzko decided to include a clip show episode, which reuses previously produced animation, instead of letting many of the creative staff go. Inspired by Samurai Champloos clip show episode "The Disorder Diaries", they chose to frame a series of edited clips from the previous seasons of The Legend of Korra with about five minutes of new animation. Aired as episode 8, "Remembrances", the clip show was also intended as "a lighthearted romp" similar to Avatar: The Last Airbenders episode "The Ember Island Players" before the series enters its dénouement.

Reception

The season was generally well-received by critics. Critics generally enjoyed the main villain Kuvira and thought she complemented Korra well. IGN's Max Nicholson felt the overarching plot of Kuvira's military campaign was not as ambitious as previous seasons', though he still enjoyed it. Nicholson also praised the season for its handling of themes like war, dictatorship, weapons of mass destruction and posttraumatic stress disorder.

"Korra Alone" was praised by critics as one of best episodes of the entire series, described by Nicholson as "masterful and heart-wrenching." "Day of the Colossus" received positive reviews for its action sequences, described by ScreenCrush'''s Matt Patches as "22-minutes of set-piece wizardry, featuring some of the most imaginative, heart-pounding action I've ever seen." In contrast, the clip show "Remembrances" was singled out as a weak point in the season.

In the final scene of the season and the series, Korra and Asami face each other holding hands. This scene recalls the earlier wedding scene between Zhu Li and Varrick, as well as the last shot of Avatar: The Last Airbender, in which Aang and Katara kiss. It was subject to discussion outside of entertainment media, notably after the series' creators confirmed that the scene was meant to signify Korra and Asami becoming a romantic couple. According to Joanna Robinson for Vanity Fair, who described the series finale as "the most subversive television event of the year", it "changed the face of TV" by going further than any other work of children's television in depicting same-sex relationships – an assessment shared by reviewers for TV.com, The A.V. Club, USA Today, IGN, Moviepilot and The Advocate. Megan Farokhmanesh of Polygon wrote that by portraying Korra and Asami as bisexual, the series even avoided the error of assuming sexual orientation, as many other TV series did, to be a strict divide between "gay" and "straight". In 2018, io9'' ranked the final scene #55 on its list of "The 100 Most Important Pop Culture Moments of the Last 10 Years".

Like the third season, the final season received a 100% rating from 9 reviews on review aggregator Rotten Tomatoes and an average rating of 9/10.

Episodes

References

The Legend of Korra
2014 American television seasons